Mega Kuningan is a business district with an integrated mixed use development concept, located at Setiabudi sub-district in Jakarta, Indonesia. The CBD is surrounded by some of the main roads in Jakarta (Jalan Sudirman, Jalan Gatot Subroto, Jalan Rasuna Said, Jalan Satrio), and is located within the Golden Triangle of Jakarta.

Mega Kuningan was developed as an integrated diplomatic and business area equipped with international standard infrastructure and utility networks. In addition to commercial property, there are also embassies of six countries. Mega Kuningan is divided into eight large blocks, which are subdivided into 44 sub-blocks.

History 
This area began its history in 1990, when Rajawali Nusantara Indonesia (RNI) received a fund from the government in the form of an area of 311,930 square meters in East Kuningan, Setiabudi, South Jakarta, which was previously managed by the Indonesian Ministry of Finance.  RNI then established a joint venture company with PT Abadi Guna Papan to develop the land into this area. The cattle farm located on the land was also moved to another land in Pondok Ranggon, Cipayung, East Jakarta which was also handed over by the government to RNI.

Important buildings
The embassies of China, Kuwait, Mongolia, Pakistan, Qatar, and Thailand are located in Mega Kuningan. The area and its surrounding also hosts many other embassies, diplomatic missions, and official residence of ambassadors. Mega Kuningan area is also the location of Ciputra World Jakarta, a mixed development complex consists of an upscale shopping mall, apartments, office tower, and a five star property of Raffles Hotels & Resorts. There are offices of many local and multinational companies within Mega Kuningan. Those Important buildings in the area include:

World Capital Tower
BTPN Towers
Ritz-Carlton Jakarta Mega Kuningan
JW Marriott Jakarta
 Embassies of
 
 
 
 
 
 
 
 
 
 
 
 
 
 
 
 
Bellagio Mansion
Oakwood Premiere Cozmo Mega Kuningan
Noble House
  Embassy of Uruguay (33rd floor)
Menara Prima 1
Menara Sunlife (Menara Prima 2)
Menara Dea I 
Menara Dea II
Menara Rajawali
 Head office of Rajawali Corpora
 Embassies of:
  (25th floor)
  (9th floor)
  (20th floor)
  (12th floor)
  (9th floor)
The Hundred
The East Tower 
 NET. headquarters
  Embassy of Mexico (11th floor)
Plaza Mutiara
RDTX Tower
Satrio Tower
Somerset Grand Citra
Best Western Mega Kuningan
Branz Mega Kuningan
Pollux Sky Suites
 Mega Kuningan Office Parks
Sopo Del Tower
Verde Two Complex
Diamond Tower Mega Kuningan

Access 
The Mega Kuningan can be accessed from the main gate on Jalan Professor Dr. Satrio in the north and from Jalan HR Rasuna Said in the east.

Transportation

Bus Routes

Transjakarta 

The Mega Kuningan can be reached by various modes of transportation, such as Transjakarta which passes through Jalan HR Rasuna Said and Jalan Professor Dr.  Satrio. The following list is the Transjakarta route that passes through the area around Mega Kuningan:

 Corridor  TU Gas–Patra Kuningan
 Corridor 4H Pulo Gadung–Ragunan
 Corridor  Ragunan–Dukuh Atas 2
 Corridor  Ragunan–Monas via Kuningan
 Corridor 9K Kampung Rambutan–Halimun
 Corridor 13E Halimun–Puri Beta 1
 Corridor 6C Tebet Station - Patra Kuningan - Karet
 Corridor 6E Tebet Station- Mega Kuningan - Karet
 Corridor 6F Manggarai Station–Ragunan
 Corridor 6H Lebak Bulus - Senen
 Corridor 6M Manggarai Station–Blok M
 Royaltrans 6P Cibubur Junction - Kuningan
 Royaltrans B13 Summarecon Bekasi - Kuningan
 Royaltrans D31 South City Cinere - Kuningan

Other buses 
 Sinar Jaya AC149 Tanah Abang-Bekasi (via KH Mas Mansyur - Prof. dr. Satrio - Kp. Melayu - UKI - Bulak Kapal)
 Mikrolet M44 Kampung Melayu-Karet (via Tebet - Casablanca - Prof. dr. Satrio)

Train Lines 

The area is also served by the Cibubur  and the Bekasi Line  of the Greater Jakarta LRT with one station.

 Kuningan Station

Incidents

Mega Kuningan was affected by 2003 JW Marriott hotel bombing and the 2009 JW Marriott - Ritz-Carlton bombings .

See also 

 Rajawali Corpora
 Central business district
 Golden Triangle of Jakarta
 JW Marriott Jakarta
 World Capital Tower
 BTPN Towers

References

Central business districts in Indonesia
Buildings and structures in Jakarta
Post-independence architecture of Indonesia
Skyscraper office buildings in Indonesia
Skyscraper hotels
South Jakarta